The Southern Railway built three diesel shunters in 1937, numbered 1–3. These became British Rail 15201–15203, and were later classified as British Rail Class D3/12. Twenty-six similar locomotives were built in 1949–1951 after nationalisation. They were numbered 15211–15236, and were later classified as British Rail Class 12.

Mainline diesels
The Southern designed a prototype mainline diesel-electric locomotive. Three were built, although none were finished before nationalisation. They were numbered 10201–10203, and later classified as British Rail Class D16/2.

See also
 GWR diesel shunters
 LMS diesel shunters
 LNER internal combustion locomotives
 List of British Rail classes

Southern Railway (UK) locomotives
Diesel locomotives of Great Britain